Kátia Regina de Abreu (born 2 February 1962) is a Brazilian politician. She has been serving as the Senator from Tocantins since 2007. She was a congresswoman elected by the Tocantins State from 2003 to 2007. She is a member of Progressistas, since her leaving from Democratic Labour Party (PDT) in March 2020.

On 23 December 2014, President Dilma Rousseff appointed Abreu as Minister of Agriculture, to serve during the president's second term, amid controversies among environmentalists, including the group Greenpeace. Abreu took office on 1 January 2015 during Rousseff's second inauguration. Abreu was fired on 12 May 2016, after president Rousseff was suspended by the Senate and vice-president Michel Temer was sworn as acting president, being replaced by Blairo Maggi.

On 23 November 2017 she was expelled from the Brasilian Democratic Movement Party because of her support of the opposition. In 2018 she joined the Democratic Labour Party and supported Ciro Gomes in his bid for presidency.

References

External links
 
 
 

|-

1962 births
Living people
People from Goiânia
Progressistas politicians
Agriculture ministers of Brazil
Members of the Chamber of Deputies (Brazil) from Tocantins
Members of the Federal Senate (Brazil)
Women government ministers of Brazil
21st-century Brazilian women politicians
Candidates for Vice President of Brazil